In literary criticism, the term fabulation was popularized by Robert Scholes, in his work The Fabulators, to describe the large and growing class of mostly 20th century novels that are in a style similar to magical realism, and do not fit into the traditional categories of realism or (novelistic) romance. As M. H. Abrams wrote,  

Fabulating authors include Thomas Pynchon, John Barth, Donald Barthelme, William Gass, Robert Coover, and Ishmael Reed.

References

Further reading
Robert Scholes, The Fabulators (1967); also expanded upon in Fabulation and Metafiction (1979).
James M. Mellard, The Exploded Form: The Modernist Novel in America (1980).
Bordeleau, Erik, Toni Pape, Ronald Rose-Antoinette and Adam Szymanski. Nocturnal Fabulations: Ecology, Vitality and Opacity in the Cinema of Apichatpong Weerasethakul. Open Humanities Press (2017).

Fiction by genre
Literary criticism